Spice Williams-Crosby (born Marceline Ann Williams, April 26, 1952) is an American actress, with a career in film and television which spans more than 40 years.

Biography

Williams-Crosby was born in North Hollywood, Los Angeles, California. Her more notable roles include the Klingon officer Vixis in Star Trek V: The Final Frontier, and the assassin Patrice in Buffy the Vampire Slayer story "What's My Line". Originally involved in music and dance, she switched to acting, focusing on action roles which often featured stuntwork, making use of her martial arts and athletic skills. She has also worked as a stunt coordinator, choreographing fight scenes for television and film, including Miller Lite's controversial 2002 commercial "Catfight".

Williams-Crosby took up personal fitness at the age of 26, including bodybuilding and nutrition. She is a PhD, sixth-degree blackbelt, a vegan, and has written a book and several articles on the subject. She is married to screenwriter/film producer Gregory Crosby (Hacksaw Ridge); the couple have one son, Luke Gregory.

Selected filmography

Film

 1984 Fatal Games
 1987 Stranded
 1989 Star Trek V: The Final Frontier
 1991 The Guyver (stunts)
 1992 Sleepwalkers (stunts)
 1994 T-Force
 1996 From Dusk till Dawn (stunts)
 1996 The Cherokee Kid
 1997 Liar Liar (stunts)
 2002 Spider-Man (stunts)
 2003 The Singing Detective
 2006 Million Dollar Baby
 2007 Mission: Impossible III (stunts)
 2008 Room and Board
 2010 The Dead Undead
 2016 Reach Me

Television

 1984 Getting Physical
 1987 Mama's Family
 1993 Star Trek: Deep Space Nine
 1996 7th Heaven
 1997 Buffy the Vampire Slayer
 1999 Diagnosis: Murder
 2003 Angel
 2004 Days of Our Lives
 2007 Scrubs
 2005 Charmed
 2008 Terminator: The Sarah Connor Chronicles
 2016 Comedy Get Down

References

External links
 
 
 

1952 births
20th-century American actresses
21st-century American actresses
Actresses from Los Angeles
American female bodybuilders
American film actresses
American stunt performers
American television actresses
Living people
People from North Hollywood, Los Angeles
American veganism activists